Massimiliano Di Ventra is an American-Italian theoretical physicist who has made several contributions to Condensed-Matter Physics, especially quantum transport in atomic and nanoscale systems, non-equilibrium statistical mechanics of many-body systems, DNA sequencing by tunneling, and memelements. He suggested the MemComputing paradigm of computation, and with his group derived various analytical properties of memristive networks, including the Caravelli-Traversa-Di Ventra equation, an exact equation for the evolution of the internal memory in a network of memristive devices.

Research 
Di Ventra has published more than 200 papers in refereed journals (he was named 2018 Highly Cited Researcher by Clarivate Analytics), has 7 granted patents (3 foreign), co-edited the textbook Introduction to Nanoscale Science and Technology (Springer-Verlag, 2004)  for undergraduate students, he is single author of the graduate-level textbook Electrical Transport in Nanoscale Systems (Cambridge University Press, 2008), of the trade book The Scientific Method: Reflections from a Practitioner (Oxford University Press, 2018), the monograph MemComputing: Fundamentals and Applications (Oxford University Press, 2022), and co-author of the SpringerBriefs in Physics book Memristors and Memelements: Mathematics, Physics, and Fiction (Springer, 2023). He is the co-founder of MemComputing, Inc.

Controversies 
Di Ventra was accused of retaliation against a striking UAW graduate student worker in his lab in December 2022. As part of labor negotiations, the union dropped all unfair labor practice charges against the UC when the strike ended, including the charge based on accusations against Di Ventra. The union is now pursuing this case through the grievance process, it is the only known case in the physics department where retaliation for the legally protected withholding of labor has been alleged. Di Ventra suggests that the accusations are lies and that the unsatisfactory grade he gave his worker was simply for not performing classwork in a research credits course. However, his graduate student stated that, the course in question is a "placeholder" course that is required to participate in research work while being enrolled full-time with the university. He added that he was in good standing with Di Ventra before the strike, having received a good performance review prior to the strike and having been in the process of publishing with a reputable physics journal when the strike began.

Books 
M. Di Ventra and Y.V. Pershin, Memristors and Memelements: Mathematics, Physics, and Fiction (Springer, 2023).

M. Di Ventra, MemComputing: Fundamentals and Applications (Oxford University Press, 2022).

M. Di Ventra, The Scientific Method: Reflections from a Practitioner (Oxford University Press, 2018).

M. Di Ventra, Electrical Transport in Nanoscale Systems (Cambridge University Press, 2008).

M. Di Ventra, S. Evoy, J.R. Heflin, eds., Introduction to Nanoscale Science and Technology (Springer, 2004).

References

External links 
Di Ventra's webpage
Di Ventra's Google Scholar citations

University of Trieste alumni
21st-century Italian physicists
21st-century American physicists
Fellows of the American Physical Society